Brenno il nemico di Roma ( Brennus, Enemy of Rome and Battle of the Spartans) is a 1963 film about the sack of Rome in 387 BC.

This film was written by Adriano Bolzoni, Arpad DeRiso and Nino Scolaro and was directed by Giacomo Gentilomo.

Cast
Gordon Mitchell as Brennus
Ursula Davis as Nissia
Massimo Serato as Marcus Furius Camillus
Tony Kendall as Quintus Fabius
Erno Crisa as Decius Vatinius
Pietro Tordi as Vaxo
Nerio Bernardi

See also
 List of films set in ancient Rome

External links
 

1963 films
Films set in the 4th century BC
Films set in ancient Rome
Italian films based on actual events
Peplum films
1960s historical films
Sword and sandal
Sword and sandal films
1960s Italian films